Gordon Stanley Shipp (1891-1981) was a Canadian speculative and custom home builder. He founded his firm in 1923 when he moved from western Ontario, where he was a farmer.

He later became the president of the Canadian Home Builders' Association.

Personal life 
He married Bessie Louella Breeze and they had two children. He is the father of Harold Shipp.

References 

1891 births
Canadian real estate businesspeople
1981 deaths